Viktor Kryzhanivsky  (21 December 1961 – 16 October 2021) was a Ukrainian diplomat, who served as Ambassador Extraordinary and Plenipotentiary of Ukraine.

Early life and education 
Born in Zhytomyr, on 21 December 1961, Kryzhanivsky graduated from Taras Shevchenko National University of Kyiv, (1984). He held a Ph.D. Degree in jurisprudence from the Institute of State and Law, Academy of Sciences of Ukraine (1987). He was fluent in both English and Russian.

Professional career and experience 
In 1990 - He was senior economist, Head of Division Association “Ukrintour”, Kyiv.
In 1990 - 1992 - Commercial Director Joint venture “Apolo”, Kyiv
From 02.1992 to 12.1992 - Second, Third Secretary, Division of Conference for Security and Cooperation in Europe and Regional Cooperation, Ministry of Foreign Affairs of Ukraine.
From 12.1993 to 04.1995 - Head of Division, Director, Department of Conference for Security and Cooperation in Europe and European Regional Cooperation, Ministry of Foreign Affairs of Ukraine.
From 04.1995 to 06.1998 - Counsellor Permanent Mission of Ukraine to the International Organizations in Vienna.
From 06.1998 to 08.1998 - Deputy Director Department of European and Transatlantic Integration, Ministry of Foreign Affairs of Ukraine.
From 08.1998 to 01.1999 - Deputy Director Department of European Integration - Head of Division of NATO and Western European Cooperation, Ministry of Foreign Affairs of Ukraine.
From 01.1999 to 09.2000 - Deputy Director Department of European Integration, Ministry of Foreign Affairs of Ukraine.
From 09.2000 to 03.2003 - Deputy Permanent Representative of Ukraine to International Organizations in Vienna.
From 03.2003 to 03.2005 - Deputy Head Main Directorate on Foreign Policy issues, Administration of the President of Ukraine.
From 09.2005 to 09.2008 - Deputy Permanent Representative of Ukraine to the United Nations.
From 08.2008 to 07.2010 - He was Special Envoy of Ukraine on Transnistria settlement.
From 27 October 2010 - Ambassador Extraordinary and Plenipotentiary of Ukraine to Estonia.

Diplomatic rank 
 Ambassador Extraordinary and Plenipotentiary of Ukraine.

References

External links 
 Embassy of Ukraine in the Republic of Estonia
 An Adventure in Integration. Q&A with Ukraine’s Ambassador to Estonia
 Diplomats break down barriers with football
 Permanent Mission of Ukraine to the United Nations
 Observing 10 Years of Independence at the Permanent Mission of Ukraine to the United Nations

1961 births
2021 deaths
People from Zhytomyr
Taras Shevchenko National University of Kyiv alumni
Koretsky Institute of State and Law alumni
Ambassadors of Ukraine to Estonia
Ukrainian jurists